The 2004–05 season of the Eredivisie started on August 13, 2004 and ended on May 22, 2005. The title was won by PSV. FC Den Bosch and De Graafschap were relegated to the Eerste Divisie at the end of the season.

Promoted teams
FC Den Bosch (Eerste Divisie champion)
De Graafschap (6th, promoted through playoffs)

Relegated at the end of the season
De Graafschap (17th, relegated through playoffs)
FC Den Bosch (18th)

League table

Results

Promotion/relegation play-offs

Top scorers

Awards

Dutch Footballer of the Year
 2004-05 — Mark van Bommel (PSV)

See also
2004–05 Eerste Divisie
2004–05 KNVB Cup

References

 Eredivisie official website - info on all seasons 
 RSSSF

Eredivisie seasons
Netherlands
1